Wednesfield Academy (formerly University of Wolverhampton Wednesfield Academy, Wednesfield High Specialist Engineering Academy and Wednesfield High School) is a mixed secondary school and sixth form located in the Wednesfield area of Wolverhampton in the West Midlands of England.

Previously a community school administered by Wolverhampton City Council, Wednesfield High School converted to academy status in January 2015 and was renamed Wednesfield High Specialist Engineering Academy. The school was sponsored by the University of Wolverhampton Multi Academy Trust from 2015 to 2023. It is now a member of Matrix Academy Trust however the school continues to coordinate with City of Wolverhampton Council for admissions. In September 2021, the academy was renamed University of Wolverhampton Wednesfield Academy and in January 2023, it was renamed Wednesfield Academy.

Wednesfield Academy offers GCSEs, BTECs and Cambridge Nationals as programmes of study for pupils, while students in the sixth form have the option to study from a range of A-levels and further BTECs. The school also has a specialism in engineering.

References

External links
 

Secondary schools in Wolverhampton
Academies in Wolverhampton
University of Wolverhampton

Specialist engineering colleges in England